The 1966 Major League Baseball season was contested from April 11 to October 9, 1966. The Braves played their inaugural season in Atlanta, following their relocation from Milwaukee.  Three teams played the 1966 season in new stadiums.  On April 12, the Braves ushered in Atlanta–Fulton County Stadium with the Pittsburgh Pirates taking a 3–2 win in 13 innings.  One week later, Anaheim Stadium opened with the California Angels losing to the Chicago White Sox, 3–1 in the Angels' debut following their move from Los Angeles to nearby Orange County.  On May 8, the St. Louis Cardinals closed out old Sportsman's Park/Busch Stadium I with a 10–5 loss to the San Francisco Giants before opening the new Busch Memorial Stadium four days later with a 4–3 win in 12 innings over the Atlanta Braves.

In the World Series the Baltimore Orioles defeated the Los Angeles Dodgers 4 games to 0.

Awards and honors
Baseball Hall of Fame
Casey Stengel
Ted Williams
Most Valuable Player
Frank Robinson, Baltimore Orioles, OF (AL)
Roberto Clemente, Pittsburgh Pirates, OF (NL)
Cy Young Award
Sandy Koufax, Los Angeles Dodgers
Rookie of the Year
Tommie Agee, Chicago White Sox, OF (AL)
Tommy Helms, Cincinnati Reds, 2B (NL)
The Sporting News Player of the Year Award
Frank Robinson, Baltimore Orioles
The Sporting News American League Pitcher of the Year
Jim Kaat, Minnesota Twins
The Sporting News National League Pitcher of the Year
Sandy Koufax, Los Angeles Dodgers
Gold Glove Award
Joe Pepitone (1B) (AL) 
Bobby Knoop (2B) (AL) 
Brooks Robinson (3B) (AL) 
Luis Aparicio (SS) (AL) 
Tommie Agee (OF) (AL) 
Al Kaline (OF) (AL) 
Tony Oliva (OF) (AL)
Bill Freehan (C) (AL) 
Jim Kaat (P) (AL)

MLB statistical leaders

1 American League Triple Crown Batting Winner
2 National League Triple Crown Pitching

Standings

American League

National League

Postseason

Bracket

Managers

American League

National League

Home Field Attendance

Events
January 20 – The Baseball Writers' Association of America voters elect Ted Williams to the Hall of Fame. Williams receives 282 of a possible 302 votes.
February 28 – Seeking an unprecedented 3-year $1.05 million to be divided evenly, the Dodgers' Sandy Koufax and Don Drysdale begin a joint holdout.
March 5 – In what will prove to be one of the more influential off-the-field events in Major League history, representatives of the players elect Marvin Miller to the post of executive director of the Major League Players Association (MLPA).
March 8 – The Special Veterans Committee waives Hall of Fame election rules and inducts Casey Stengel, recently retired manager of the New York Mets.
March 17 – Sandy Koufax and Don Drysdale escalate their threat of retirement by signing movie contracts.
March 30 – Sandy Koufax and Don Drysdale end their 32-day holdout, signing for $130,000 and $105,000 respectively.
April 3 – USC pitcher Tom Seaver signs with the New York Mets.  He had been drafted by the Atlanta Braves, but they had signed him to a minor league contract while he was still in college.  This voided Seaver's remaining eligibility, and voided the contract.  The Mets won a special lottery over Cleveland and Philadelphia to win the right to sign him.
April 11 – Emmett Ashford takes the field in Washington to officiate a 5–2 Washington Senators win over the Cleveland Indians.  He is the first African-American umpire in Major League history.
April 12 – Over 50,000 fans show up at Atlanta–Fulton County Stadium to watch the Braves' first home game in Atlanta.  The Braves fall to the Pittsburgh Pirates 3–2 in 13 innings, however.
May 8 – The visiting San Francisco Giants defeat the St. Louis Cardinals, 10–5 in the final game at Busch Stadium I.
May 12 – Four days after the closing of Busch Stadium I, the St. Louis Cardinals defeat the visiting Atlanta Braves 4–3 in 12 innings, in front of 46,048 fans in attendance, in the first game at Busch Memorial Stadium.
May 14 – The San Francisco Giants' Willie Mays hits his then National League record 512th home run – topping another Giant, Mel Ott.  The Giants beat the Los Angeles Dodgers 6–1 at San Francisco's Candlestick Park.
June 7 – The Kansas City Athletics use the second overall pick to draft Arizona State outfielder Reggie Jackson.
June 10 – Sonny Siebert of the Cleveland Indians no-hits the Washington Senators 2–0 at Cleveland Stadium. The no-hitter is the first by an Indian since Bob Feller's third career no-hitter, in 1951.
July 3 – Atlanta pitcher Tony Cloninger hits two grand slams in a game against the Giants, the first National League player and first pitcher in history to do so.  His nine RBI in a game is a record for pitchers.
July 12 – At St. Louis, Maury Wills' 10th-inning single scores Tim McCarver, as the National League wins 2–1 over the American League in the All-Star Game, but AL Brooks Robinson's stellar game (three hits, eight fielding chances) earns him the MVP honors.
July 25 – During his Hall of Fame induction speech, Ted Williams publicly calls on baseball to induct former great players from the Negro leagues.  He specifically calls for the induction of Josh Gibson and Satchel Paige.
September 22 – The Baltimore Orioles beat the host Kansas City Athletics 6–1 to clinch their first American League pennant since moving to Baltimore. Both Brooks Robinson and Frank Robinson have two RBIs. Frank Robinson will end the year as the Triple Crown winner, the first to achieve the feat since Mickey Mantle in 1956. He clinches with a batting average of .316, 49 home runs and 122 RBIs.
September 26 – Willie McCovey hits his 200th career home run, helping the San Francisco Giants beat the Atlanta Braves 8–2.
October 9 – In Game Four of the World Series, Dave McNally wraps up a brilliant pitching display, and the first World Championship for the Baltimore Orioles, with a four-hit, 1–0 shutout against the Los Angeles Dodgers. Series MVP Frank Robinson hits a home run off Don Drysdale for the only run of the game and gave Baltimore a surprising sweep of the defending World Champion Dodgers. The shutout completes a World Series record  scoreless innings pitched by Orioles pitchers, beginning with Moe Drabowsky pitching 6 innings in relief of McNally in Game One, followed by shutouts by Jim Palmer and Wally Bunker.  The Orioles are the last of the original eight American League franchises to win their first World Series.

See also
1966 Nippon Professional Baseball season

References

External links
1966 Major League Baseball season schedule

 
Major League Baseball seasons